John Heath (May 8, 1758October 13, 1810) was an American lawyer and politician from Northumberland County, Virginia. He represented Virginia in the U.S. House of Representatives from 1793 to 1797.  Heath was one of the students at William and Mary who organized the Phi Beta Kappa fraternity in 1776, and served as its first president.

The town of Heathsville, Virginia, the county seat of Northumberland County, is named for him.

References

External links
Heath's Congressional biography

1758 births
1810 deaths
Members of the Virginia House of Delegates
College of William & Mary alumni
Virginia lawyers
Phi Beta Kappa founders
Democratic-Republican Party members of the United States House of Representatives from Virginia
Virginia colonial people
People from Northumberland County, Virginia
18th-century American politicians